Zenopontonia is a genus of shrimp within the family Palaemonidae.

Species
The World Register of Marine Species lists the following species:-
Zenopontonia noverca (Kemp, 1922)
Zenopontonia rex (Kemp, 1922)
Zenopontonia soror (Nobili, 1904)

References

 Bruce, A. J. (1975). Notes on some Indo-Pacific Pontoniinae, XXV. Further observations upon Periclimenes noverca Kemp, 1922, with the designation of a new genus Zenopontonia, and some remarks upon Periclimenes parasiticus Borradaile (Decapoda Natantia, Palaemonidae). Crustaceana. 28: 275-285
 De Grave, S.; Fransen, C.H.J.M. (2011). Carideorum catalogus: the recent species of the dendrobranchiate, stenopodidean, procarididean and caridean shrimps (Crustacea: Decapoda). Zoologische Mededelingen, Leiden. 85(9): 195-589

Palaemonidae
Decapod genera